Liu Baogang (born 10 September 1963) is a Chinese rower. He competed in the men's coxless four event at the 1984 Summer Olympics.

References

1963 births
Living people
Chinese male rowers
Olympic rowers of China
Rowers at the 1984 Summer Olympics
Place of birth missing (living people)